Zimbabwe competed at the 2004 Summer Olympics in Athens, Greece, from 13 to 29 August 2004. This was the nation's seventh consecutive appearance at the Olympics, after gaining its independence from the former Rhodesia.

The Zimbabwe Olympic Committee (ZOC) sent a total of twelve athletes, nine men and three women, competing only in athletics, shooting, swimming, and tennis. They marched in the middle of the parade of nations as the 53rd nation due to the use of the Greek alphabet, instead of the penultimate position, just before the host nation, as it has usually been placed. Notable athletes featured tennis siblings Cara (women's singles) and Wayne Black (men's doubles), and sprinters Brian Dzingai and Young Talkmore Nyongani, who became the nation's flag bearer in the opening ceremony.

Zimbabwe left Athens with a full set of three Olympic medals for the first time in history since the 1980 Summer Olympics in Moscow. This full set was officially awarded to swimmer Kirsty Coventry, who took home the gold in the 200 m backstroke, silver in the 100 m backstroke, and bronze in the 200 m individual medley.

Medalists

Athletics

Zimbabwean athletes have so far achieved qualifying standards in the following athletics events (up to a maximum of 3 athletes in each event at the 'A' Standard, and 1 at the 'B' Standard).

Men

Women

Key
Note–Ranks given for track events are within the athlete's heat only
Q = Qualified for the next round
q = Qualified for the next round as a fastest loser or, in field events, by position without achieving the qualifying target
NR = National record
N/A = Round not applicable for the event
Bye = Athlete not required to compete in round

Shooting

Men

Swimming 

Men

Women

Tennis

See also
 Zimbabwe at the 2004 Summer Paralympics

References

External links
Official Report of the XXVIII Olympiad

Nations at the 2004 Summer Olympics
2004
2004 in Zimbabwean sport